Barsky Forest is a forest in the northwestern part of Ishimbaysky District of Bashkortostan (Russia). It covers an area of 14 km ² and is located approximately 20 km from Sterlitamak and 20 km from Ishimbay. 

The principal tree species in Barsky Forest are oak and lime.

See also 
 Akhmerovsky Forest

References 

Forests of Russia
Geography of Bashkortostan